Battle of Umberkhind took place on 3 February 1661 in the mountain range of Sahyadri near the city of Khopoli, Maharashtra, India. The battle was fought between the Maratha army under Chhatrapati Shivaji Maharaj and General Kartalab Khan of the Mughal Empire. The Marathas defeated  the Mughal forces.  This battle was a great example of guerrilla warfare. On the orders of Aurangzeb, Shahista Khan sent Kartalab Khan and Rai Bagan to attack Rajgad Fort. Shivaji's men encountered them in a forest in the mountain hills, which was called the Umberkhind.

Battle
After Aurangzeb's accession to the throne in 1659, he sent Shahista Khan as a viceroy of the Deccan with a large Mughal Army to enforce the treaty, which Mughals had signed with the Adilshahi of Bijapur. However, this territory was also fiercely contested by the Maratha ruler, Shivaji who had acquired a huge reputation after his killing of a Adilshahi general, Afzal Khan, in 1659. In January 1660, Shahista Khan arrived at Aurangabad and quickly advanced, seizing Pune area, the centre of Shivaji's realm. He also captured the fort of Chakan and Kalyan and north Konkan after heavy fighting with the Marathas. The Marathas were banned from entering into the city of Pune. Kartalab Khan and Rai Bagan were told to assist Shahista Khan in his campaign. Shahista Khan sent both Kartalab Khan and Rai Bagan to capture Rajgad Fort. So they went on their way with 20,000 soldiers for each of them. Shivaji wanted Kartalab Khan and the famous Rai Bagan (Royal Tigress), the wife of Deshmukh of Mahur Sarkar of Berar Subah Raje Udaram, to enter Umberkhind, so that they become easy prey to his preplanned guerilla technique. When the Mughals entered Umberkhind, a 15 miles passage, Shivaji's men started blowing horns. The whole Mughal army got stunned. Then the Marathas started attacking the Mughal Army with a barrage of arrows. Kartalab Khan and Rai Bagan along with the other Mughal soldiers tried to retaliate in emergency, but the forest was so dense and the Maratha Army was so quick and prepared, that the Mughals could not even see the enemy. The situation was such that Mughal soldiers were being killed by arrows and swords, without even, seeing where the enemy was, from where the blow is coming and without knowing where to shoot. A large number of the Mughal soldiers died in this way.

Rai Bagan then advised Kartalab Khan, that he should surrender himself to Shivaji and should ask for mercy. She said, "Shivaji is a lion and you have made a huge mistake by putting the whole army into the lion's jaw. You should not have chosen this path to attack Shivaji. Now, to save these dying soldiers, you should surrender yourself to Shivaji. Unlike Mughals, Shivaji shows amnesty for those who surrender." The battle lasted for an hour or two. And then Kartalab Khan on advise of Rai Bagan, sent the soldiers with a white flag for truce. They shouted “truce, truce!” and within a minute got encircled by Shivaji's men. Then on the condition of paying a large ransom and surrendering all their arms and clothes, Kartalab Khan was allowed to go back to his main Mughal camp. Shivaji then stationed his renowned general Netaji Palkar in Umberkhind to keep a check on the Mughals, if they come back.

References

1661 in India
Umberkhind 1661
Umberkhind
Shivaji